Lazard Carnegie Wylie is a boutique investment bank that advises on mergers and acquisitions, restructurings, initial public offerings and related transactions. The firm was founded in 2000 by John Wylie and Mark Carnegie. In July 2007, Carnegie, Wylie & Co was acquired by Lazard  and is now a subsidiary of that firm. Former Prime Minister of Australia,  Paul Keating is the International Chairman.

See also
 Corporate advisory

References
 U.S. investment bank Lazard buys Australia's Carnegie Wylie - International Herald Tribune, 31 July 2007

Investment banks